Fernando de Silva y Álvarez de Toledo, 12th Duke of Alba (27 October 1714 – 15 November 1776), was a Spanish politician and general who was Prime Minister of Spain in 1754.

Biography
Better known as the Duke of Huéscar, Fernando de Silva was a man of the Enlightenment and friend of Jean-Jacques Rousseau. He was Spanish ambassador to France between 1746 and 1749. On 8 November 1753 he was appointed Mayordomo mayor and chief of the Royal Household and, on 9 April 1754 he was made director of the Real Academia Española, a function he held until his death in 1776.

He was also Chief Minister of Spain between 9 April and 15 May 1754. As Duke of Alba, he was succeeded by his granddaughter María del Pilar de Silva, 13th Duchess of Alba, who was a friend of Francisco de Goya, who visited their villa on several occasions and painted there in 1786 El verano and La vendimia.

Descendants
He had married Ana María Alvarez de Toledo y de Portugal, (1710–1738), daughter of the 9th Count of Oropesa. They had one son, who pre-deceased his father:

Francisco de Paula de Silva Mendoza y Toledo, 10th Duke of Huéscar, (1733–1770) who had one daughter.
María del Pilar de Silva, 13th Duchess of Alba (1762–1802).

Ancestry

Notes

Sources

1714 births
1776 deaths
Fernando 12
Dukes of Huéscar
Knights of the Golden Fleece of Spain
Knights of Calatrava
Fernando 12
Fernando 12
Members of the Royal Spanish Academy
Spanish generals
Government ministers of Spain
Grandees of Spain
Marquesses of Carpio
Spanish nobility